Negro Romance is a romance comic book published in the 1950s by Fawcett Comics. It is remarkable in eschewing African-American stereotypes, telling stories interchangeable with those told about white characters. The comic even mentions college, which was relatively uncommon in the 1950s, even more so among African-Americans. Negro Romance ran for only three issues and the first issue was published in June 1950. The third and last issue was published in October, 1950.

History 
Negro Romance was developed as an experiment in expanding into the romance market, conceived by editor Roy Ald, who was European-American, and written by him without credit. It was illustrated by Alvin Hollingsworth, the first African-American artist hired by Fawcett.

See also 
 All-Negro Comics
 Portrayal of black people in comics

References 

Fawcett Comics titles
1950 comics debuts
1950 comics endings
Romance comics
Black people in comics